The All-Belarusian Unity and Accord Party (Partiia vsebelorusskogo edinstva i soglasiia, PVES) was a political party in Belarus.

History
The party contested the 1995 parliamentary elections, winning two seats in the fourth round of voting. When the National Assembly was established in 1996, the party was given one seat in the House of Representatives. However, it was closed down by the Supreme Court in 1998.

References

Political parties disestablished in 1998
Defunct political parties in Belarus